Tweedledum & Tweedledee (Two People Who Resemble Each Other, in this Case Musically) is a 1991 (see 1991 in music) studio album by Blossom Dearie and Mike Renzi.

Track listing
"I Don't Remember" (Blossom Dearie, Jack Segal)
"Ev'rybody Loves Jobim" (Louis Adlebert, Louis Aldebert, Monique Aldebert)
"I Thought I Heard a Hummingbird" (Blossom Dearie, Jack Segal)
"The Quiet Time" (Duncan Lamont)
"My Love Went to London" (Tony Scibetta, John Wallowitch)
"I Did It All for You" (Duncan Lamont)
"Not You Again" (Duncan Lamont)
"Blossom" (John Densem)
"Love is On the Way" (Blossom Dearie, Jack Segal)
"Fred Astaire" (Duncan Lamont)
"A Nightingale Sang in Berkeley Square" (Eric Maschwitz, Manning Sherwin)

Personnel
Blossom Dearie – piano, vocals
Mike Renzi

References

1991 albums
Blossom Dearie albums
Daffodil Records albums
Jazz albums by American artists
Cool jazz albums